Mishcon may refer to:
Victor Mishcon, Baron Mishcon, (1915–2006), British solicitor
Mishcon de Reya, a British law firm founded by Victor Mishcon